Marczak is a surname of Polish origin. Notable people with the surname include:

 Michał Marczak, Polish director and cinematographer
 Ryszard Marczak (born 1945), Polish Olympic athlete
 Sebastian Marczak (born 1983), Australian sprint canoeist

Surnames of Polish origin